William Bodrugan may refer to:
William Bodrugan (priest) (c. 1250 – 1307), Archdeacon of Cornwall and Provost of Glasney College
William Bodrugan (fl. 1384–1401), MP for Cornwall, Helston and Dunheved
William Bodrugan (died 1416), MP for Cornwall and Liskeard
William Bodrugan (fl. 1420–1433), MP for Cornwall